The 2002 NCAA National Collegiate Women's Ice Hockey Tournament involved four schools playing in single-elimination play to determine the national champion of women's NCAA Division I college ice hockey. The tournament began on March 22, 2002, and ended with the championship game on March 24.

Qualifying teams
The at-large bids, along with the seeding for each team in the tournament, were announced on Sunday, March 17.

Brackets

Frozen Four – Durham, New Hampshire

All-Tournament Team
G: Tania Pinelli, Niagara
D: Larissa Luther, Minnesota–Duluth
D: Meredith Ostrander, Brown
F: Kelly Stephens, Minnesota
F: Joanne Eustace, Minnesota–Duluth
F: Kristy Zamora, Brown*
* Most Outstanding Player(s)

References

External links
NCAA Women's Ice Hockey - NCAA.com

NCAA Women's Ice Hockey Tournament
Ice hockey in New Hampshire
NCAA National Collegiate Women's Ice Hockey Tournament
NCAA National Collegiate Women's Ice Hockey Tournament